Natalya Gorbachova (born 24 July 1947) is a Soviet athlete. She competed in the women's discus throw at the 1976 Summer Olympics.

References

1947 births
Living people
Athletes (track and field) at the 1976 Summer Olympics
Soviet female discus throwers
Olympic athletes of the Soviet Union
Place of birth missing (living people)